George Winslow Plummer (August 26, 1876 – January 23, 1944) was Imperator and Supreme Magus of the Societas Rosicruciana in America (S. R. I. A.) from 1909 to 1944. Under his auspices the organization was given its contemporary structure. The title was passed on to him by Frater Sylvester Clark Gould (March 1, 1840 - July 19, 1909) in New York, from whom he received full initiation and authority to begin the work. Plummer held this office until his death on January 23, 1944.

Biography
He was born on August 26, 1876.

He was adept of the lodge Metropolitan Consistory No. 1 from its institution in 1935.

He died on January 23, 1944.

References

1876 births
1944 deaths
American occultists
Rosicrucians